Ketty Diridaoua (1921 – February 9, 1996) was a Greek actress and singer. In 1955 she married actor Kostas Hatzichristos. They had a daughter and divorced in 1975.

She was born Aikaterini Oikonomou (Αικατερίνη Οικονόμου).  The name Diridaoua was a pseudonym that originates from the city Dire Dawa in Ethiopia. She died on February 9, 1996, at the age of 75.

Filmography

Koinoniki sapila (1932)
Dipli thysia (1945)
Ririka (1951)

External links

1921 births
1996 deaths
20th-century Greek actresses
Actors from Thessaloniki